This is a list of Finnish football transfers in the summer transfer window 2014 by club. Only transfers of the Veikkausliiga and Ykkönen are included.

2014 Veikkausliiga
Note: Flags indicate national team as has been defined under FIFA eligibility rules. Players may hold more than one non-FIFA nationality.

FC Honka

In:

Out:

FC Inter
In:

FC Lahti

In:

Out:

FF Jaro
In:

HJK

In:

Out:

IFK Mariehamn
In:

KuPS
In:

MYPA
Out:

RoPS

In:

Out:

SJK

In:

Out:

TPS

In:

Out:

VPS
In:

2014 Ykkönen 
Note: Flags indicate national team as has been defined under FIFA eligibility rules. Players may hold more than one non-FIFA nationality.

AC Oulu
In:

FC Haka

In:

Out:

FC Ilves

In:

Out:

FC Jazz

In:

Out:

FC Viikingit
Out:

HIFK

In:

Out:

JIPPO
In:

JJK
In:

KTP
In:

See also
2014 Veikkausliiga
2014 Ykkönen

References 

Finnish
Transfers
2014